Julis is a village in Northern Israel

Julis may also refer to:

 Julis, Gaza, a former village in Gaza, Israel
Julis Cuvier, 1814, a synonym of the fish genus Coris

Youth organizations:
 Young Liberals (Germany), or Junge Liberale ("Julis")
 Young Liberals (Austria), or Junge Liberale ("Julis"), now: JUNOS – Young liberal NEOS

People:
 Mitchell R. Julis,  American businessman 
 Lukáš Juliš, Czech footballer

See also
 Juli (disambiguation)